Deryagino is a rural locality (a village) in Kameshnikovskoye Rural Settlement, Sheksninsky District, Vologda Oblast, Russia. The population was 33 as of 2002.

Geography 
Deryagino is located 57 km north of Sheksna (the district's administrative centre) by road. Bereznik is the nearest rural locality.

References 

Rural localities in Sheksninsky District